The Cornish-Mexican Cultural Society is a society that tries to advance awareness of the historical and  modern links between Cornwall and Mexico’s “Little Cornwall”, the area of Pachuca and Real del Monte in the state of Hidalgo, Mexico.

Background

The municipality of Pachuca has a long history of gold and silver mining, but during the Mexican War of Independence (1810–1821) much of the infrastructure was destroyed and many of the mines became flooded.
A group named the Real del Monte Company was formed in 1824 and arranged to bring mining equipment and experienced miners from Cornwall.
After landing on Mocambo beach, south of Veracruz, the miners took 14 months to struggle  through swamps and rain forests to Real del Monte.

The Cornish brought cultural traditions that included football, wrestling and baking pasties.
Although the Cornish community shrank after the 1911 revolution, some Cornish names survive. 
There are buildings and houses with British architecture, including Francis Rule's Methodist Church.

History
The CMCS was founded in 2006. The objectives were to foster historic cultural ties between Cornwall and Mexico, particularly the municipalities of Pachuca and Real del Monte in Hidalgo, to enable cultural links to be reestablished between the two mining districts.
The driving force was the late Richard Williams, who had been visiting "Little Cornwall" in Mexico since 1998.
There were plans for society members to visit Mexico in July 2008 and retrace the route the original party took in 1825–26, reaching Real del Monte on Miner's Day.
In September 2008 Dave Evan and 30 other members of the association travelled to Mexico to explore the route taken by their ancestors.
Jean Charman, Mayor of Camborne, and the historian Richard Williams accompanied the group.
In 2008 the Cornish-Mexican Cultural Society helped arrange for Real del Monte and Redruth in Cornwall to be twinned.

The 3-day International Pasty Festival was launched in Real del Monte in October 2009.
Richard Williams, president of the Sociedad Cornish Mexicana, was among those present.
In May 2011 the society published Mining a Shared Heritage: Mexico’s ‘Little Cornwall’, written by the specialist in Cornish mining migration, Sharron Schwartz.
It explored the historic links and the way in which families in Mexico and Cornwall are renewing those links.
Prince Charles and the Duchess of Cornwall visited Real del Monte on the Day of the Dead in 2014. 
They visited the Pasty Museum, where the couple made pasties.
According to Stephen Lay, CMCS spokesman, "It's uncanny, the Cornish influence is abundantly clear even today – pasties are probably even more popular and widely produced than in Cornwall itself."

Notes

Sources

Cornish culture
Cultural heritage of Mexico
Pachuca
Cornish diaspora